Julian Beck (May 31, 1925 – September 14, 1985) was an American actor, stage director, poet, and painter. He is best known for co-founding and directing The Living Theatre, as well as his role as Reverend Henry Kane, the malevolent preacher in the supernatural horror film Poltergeist II: The Other Side (1986). The Living Theatre and its founders were the subject of the documentary film Signals Through the Flames (1983).

Early life
Beck was born on May 31, 1925, in the Washington Heights, Manhattan, to Mabel Lucille, a teacher, and Irving Beck, a businessman. He briefly attended Yale University, but dropped out to pursue writing and art. He was an abstract expressionist painter in the 1940s, but his career turned upon meeting his future wife. In 1943, he met Judith Malina and quickly came to share her passion for theatre; they founded The Living Theatre in 1947.

Career
Beck co-directed the Living Theatre until his death. The group's primary influence was Antonin Artaud, who espoused the Theatre of Cruelty, which was supposed to shock the audience out of complacency. This took different forms. In one example, from Jack Gelber's The Connection (1959), a drama about drug addiction, actors playing junkies wandered the audience demanding money for a fix.
The Living Theatre moved out of New York in 1964, after the Internal Revenue Service (IRS) shut it down when Beck failed to pay $23,000 in back taxes. After a sensational trial in which Beck and Malina represented themselves, they were found guilty by a jury.

Beck's philosophy of theatre carried over into his life.  He once said, "We insisted on experimentation that was an image for a changing society. If one can experiment in theatre, one can experiment in life." He was indicted a dozen times on three continents for charges such as disorderly conduct, indecent exposure, possession of narcotics, and failing to participate in a civil defense drill.

Besides his theatre work, Beck published several volumes of poetry reflecting his anarchist beliefs, two non-fiction books: The Life of the Theatre and Theandric and had several film appearances, with small roles in Oedipus Rex (1967), Love and Anger (1969), The Cotton Club (1984), 9½ Weeks (1986), and his role as the main antagonist in Poltergeist II: The Other Side (1986).  Beck also appeared in an episode of Miami Vice that was aired 13 days after his death.

Personal life
Beck and Malina were life partners in an open marriage, and Beck had a long-term relationship with Ilion Troya, a male actor in the company. Malina and Beck shared a lover in Lester Schwartz, a bisexual shipyard worker who was the third husband of Andy Warhol acolyte Dorothy Podber. Beck and Malina had "two offstage children", Garrick and Isha.

Death
Beck was diagnosed with stomach cancer in late 1983, and died two years later on September 14, 1985, at Mount Sinai Hospital in New York City, aged 60. He was survived by his wife, their two children, Garrick and Isha, and a brother. He was interred at Cedar Park Cemetery, in Emerson, New Jersey.

In 2004, 19 years after his death, Beck was posthumously inducted into the American Theater Hall of Fame. Judith Malina was also inducted to the Hall of Fame that same year.

Filmography
 Narcissus (1958) – Narration (voice)
 The Queen of Sheba Meets the Atom Man (1963)
 Oedipus Rex (1967) – Tiresia
 Après la Passion selon Sade (1968)
 Candy (1968)
 Love and Anger (1969) – Dying Man (segment "Agonia")
 The Cotton Club (1984) – Sol Weinstein
 Miami Vice (1985) – J.B. Johnston ("Prodigal Son" episode)
 9½ Weeks (1986) – Dinner Guest (posthumous release)
 Poltergeist II: The Other Side (1986) – Rev. Henry Kane (posthumous release; final film role)

References

Further reading
 Living Theater Records, circa 1947-2007 (344 boxes) are housed in the Yale University Beinecke Library.
 Julian Beck Collection, at the Harry Ransom Center at the University of Texas at Austin.

External links

 Living Theatre records, 1945-1991, held by the Billy Rose Theatre Division, New York Public Library for the Performing Arts
 
 
 
 

1925 births
1985 deaths
20th-century American male actors
20th-century American poets
American anarchists
American male film actors
American theatre directors
Bisexual male actors
Bisexual poets
Burials at Cedar Park Cemetery (Emerson, New Jersey)
Deaths from cancer in New York (state)
Deaths from stomach cancer
Jewish American artists
Jewish American male actors
Jewish American writers
Jewish anarchists
Jewish painters
Jewish poets
Bisexual Jews
LGBT theatre directors
LGBT painters
LGBT people from New York (state)
American LGBT poets
American LGBT artists
Male actors from New York City
People from Washington Heights, Manhattan
Poets from New York (state)
Writers from Manhattan
American bisexual actors
American bisexual writers